Chahardahi may refer to:
 Chahardahi-ye Asgar
 Chahardahi-ye Sohrab